() is a French noun referring to a person, literally meaning "stroller", "lounger", "saunterer", or "loafer", but with some nuanced additional meanings (including as a loanword into English).  is the act of strolling, with all of its accompanying associations.

The  was, first of all, a literary type from 19th-century France, essential to any picture of the streets of Paris. The word carried a set of rich associations: the man of leisure, the idler, the urban explorer, the connoisseur of the street. However, the flâneur's origins are to be found in journalism of the Restoration, and the politics of postrevolutionary public space.
It was Walter Benjamin, drawing on the poetry of Charles Baudelaire, who made this figure the object of scholarly interest in the 20th century, as an emblematic archetype of urban, modern (even modernist) experience. Following Benjamin, the  has become an important symbol for scholars, artists, and writers. The term has acquired an additional architecture and urban planning sense, referring to passers-by who experience incidental or intentional psychological effects from the design of a structure.

Etymology

 derives from the Old Norse verb , "to wander with no purpose".

The terms of  date to the 16th or 17th century, denoting strolling, idling, often with the connotation of wasting time. But it was in the 19th century that a rich set of meanings and definitions surrounding the  took shape.

The  was defined in 1872 in a long article in Pierre Larousse's .

By then, the term had already developed a rich set of associations. Sainte-Beuve wrote that to  "is the very opposite of doing nothing". Honoré de Balzac described  as "the gastronomy of the eye". Anaïs Bazin wrote that "the only, the true sovereign of Paris is the ". It was, rather, a way of understanding the rich variety of the city landscape; it was like "a mobile and passionate photograph" ("") of urban experience.

With Edgar Allan Poe's short story "The Man of the Crowd", the flâneur entered the literary scene. Charles Baudelaire discusses "The Man of the Crowd" in The Painter of Modern Life; it would go on to become a key example in Walter Benjamin's essay "On Some Motifs in Baudelaire", which theorizes the role of the crowd in modernity.
 But Baudelaire's association of the flâneur with artists and the world of art has been questioned.

More than this, his  was a sign of the alienation of the city. For Benjamin, the  met his demise with the triumph of consumer capitalism.

The simple  is always in full possession of his individuality, whereas the individuality of the  disappears. It is absorbed by the outside world ... which intoxicates him to the point where he forgets himself. Under the influence of the spectacle which presents itself to him, the  becomes an impersonal creature; he is no longer a human being, he is part of the public, of the crowd."

In the decades since Benjamin, the  has been the subject of a remarkable number of appropriations and interpretations. The figure of the  has been used—among other things – to explain modern, urban experience, to explain urban spectatorship, to explain the class tensions and gender divisions of the nineteenth-century city, to describe modern alienation, to explain the sources of mass culture, to explain the postmodern spectatorial gaze. And it has served as a source of inspiration to writers and artists.

Female counterparts
He portrayed several of his female characters as elusive, passing figures, who tended to ignore his obsessive (and at times possessive) view of them.

This proposal derives from the argument that women conceived and experienced public space differently from men in modern cities. Janet Wolff, in The Invisible Flâneuse: Women and the Literature of Modernity (1985), argues that the female figure of the flâneuse is absent in the literature of modernity, because public space had been gendered in modernity, leading, in turn, women's exclusion from public spaces to domestic spaces and suburbs. Elizabeth Wilson, on the other hand, in The Sphinx in the City: Urban Life, the Control of Disorder, and Women (1991), points out women's diverse experiences in public space in the modern metropolises such as London, Paris, Vienna, Berlin, discussing how the modern city was conceived as a place of freedom, autonomy, and pleasure, and how women experienced these spaces. Linda McDowell, in Gender, Identity and Place: Understanding Feminist Geographies (1999), expands this understanding to explain how public space was not experienced as a homogeneous and fixed space, and how women used particular public spaces such as beaches, cafes, and shopping malls to experience this autonomy. Departing from Wilson's approach, Lauren Elkin's Flâneuse: Women Walk the City in Paris, New York, Tokyo, Venice, and London (2017) traces a number of flâneuse women in history, such as Agnès Varda, Sophie Calle, Virginia Woolf, Martha Gellhorn, focusing on their particular relationships with particular cities.

In less academic contexts, such as newspaper book reviews, the grammatically masculine  is also applied to women (including modern ones) in essentially the same senses as for the original male referents, at least in English-language borrowings of the term. However, as these feminist scholars have argued, the word 'flâneuse' implies women's distinctive modalities of conceiving, interacting, occupying, and experiencing space.

Urban life

A  thus played a double role in city life and in theory, that is, while remaining a detached observer.

In the period after the French Revolution of 1848, during which the Empire was reestablished with clearly bourgeois pretensions of "order" and "morals", Baudelaire began asserting that traditional art was inadequate for the new dynamic complications of modern life. Social and economic changes brought by industrialization demanded that the artist immerse himself in the metropolis and become, in Baudelaire's phrase, "a botanist of the sidewalk".

The observer–participant dialectic is evidenced in part by the dandy culture. Highly self-aware, and to a certain degree flamboyant and theatrical, dandies of the mid-nineteenth century created scenes through self-consciously outrageous acts like walking turtles on leashes down the streets of Paris. Such acts exemplify a 's active participation in and fascination with street life while displaying a critical attitude towards the uniformity, speed, and anonymity of modern life in the city.

While Baudelaire's aesthetic and critical visions helped open up the modern city as a space for investigation, theorists such as Georg Simmel began to codify the urban experience in more sociological and psychological terms. In his essay "The Metropolis and Mental Life", Simmel theorized that the complexities of the modern city create new social bonds and new attitudes towards others. The modern city was transforming humans, giving them a new relationship to time and space, inculcating in them a " attitude", and altering fundamental notions of freedom and being:

Writing in 1962, Cornelia Otis Skinner suggested that there was no English equivalent of the term: "there is no Anglo-Saxon counterpart of that essentially Gallic individual, the deliberately aimless pedestrian, unencumbered by any obligation or sense of urgency, who, being French and therefore frugal, wastes nothing, including his time which he spends with the leisurely discrimination of a gourmet, savoring the multiple flavors of his city."

Architecture and urban planning
The concept of the  has also become meaningful in the psychogeography of architecture and urban planning, describing people who are indirectly and (usually) unintentionally affected by a particular design they experience only in passing.

In 1917, the Swiss writer Robert Walser published a short story called "" ("The Walk"), a veritable outcome of the  literature.

Walter Benjamin adopted the concept of the urban observer both as an analytical tool and as a lifestyle. His  is an uninvolved but highly perceptive bourgeois dilettante. Benjamin became his own prime example, making social and aesthetic observations during long walks through Paris. Even the title of his unfinished Arcades Project comes from his affection for covered shopping streets.

Photography
The 's tendency toward detached but aesthetically attuned observation has brought the term into the literature of photography, particularly street photography. The street photographer is seen as one modern extension of the urban observer described by nineteenth century journalist Victor Fournel before the advent of the hand-held camera:

She describes how, since the development of hand-held cameras in the early 20th century, the camera has become the tool of the :

Other uses
The  concept is not limited to someone committing the physical act of a peripatetic stroll in the Baudelairian sense, but can also include a "complete philosophical way of living and thinking", and a process of navigating erudition as described by Nassim Nicholas Taleb's essay "Why I Do All This Walking, or How Systems Become Fragile". Taleb further set this term with a positive connotation referring to anyone pursuing open, flexible plans, in opposition to the negative "touristification", which he defines as the pursuit of an overly orderly plan.

Using the term more critically, in "De Profundis", Oscar Wilde wrote from prison about his life regrets, stating: "I let myself be lured into long spells of senseless and sensual ease. I amused myself with being a flaneur, a dandy, a man of fashion. I surrounded myself with the smaller natures and the meaner minds."

See also
 Aestheticism
 Decadent movement
 
 The Idler (1993)
 Mopery
 People-watching
 Vagrancy - Drifter, a person who moves or drifts from place to place

References

Bibliography

 
 
 
  This book argues that there were also , in the original sense, in 19th-century American cities.
 
 
 
 Castigliano, Federico (2022). Flaneuring the buyosphere: A comparative historical analysis of shopping environments and phantasmagorias. Journal of Consumer Culture, 14695405221111454

External links

 
 

19th-century fashion
French words and phrases
Modernism
Psychogeography
Stock characters
Walking